Irakli Genovich Logua (born 29 July 1991) is a Russian professional football player of Abkhaz ethnicity. He plays for Veles Moscow.

Club career
He made his Russian Premier League debut on 24 July 2010 for FC Dynamo Moscow in a game against FC Rubin Kazan.

On 28 February 2013, Logua signed a one-year contract with Estonian Meistriliiga side Flora Tallinn. In 2013 season Logua scored 8 goals and gave 14 assists for Flora in 30 games. In the end of the season he was voted "The Favourite Player of the Year" by Flora fans. In 2014, he scored 10 goals in 35 matches and in 2015 3 goals in 19 matches. He left the club in August 2015 on a mutual agreement.

On 15 September 2019, Logua joined FC Ararat Yerevan.

References

External links
 
 
 
 

1991 births
People from Ochamchira District
Russian people of Abkhazian descent
Russian people of Georgian descent
Living people
Footballers from Abkhazia
Russian footballers
Russia youth international footballers
Association football midfielders
FC Dynamo Moscow players
FC Fakel Voronezh players
FC Sibir Novosibirsk players
FC Flora players
FC Armavir players
FC Olimp-Dolgoprudny players
FC Ararat Moscow players
FC Ararat Yerevan players
FC Veles Moscow players
Russian Premier League players
Russian First League players
Russian Second League players
Meistriliiga players
Armenian Premier League players
Russian expatriate footballers
Expatriate footballers in Estonia
Russian expatriate sportspeople in Estonia
Expatriate footballers in Armenia
Russian expatriate sportspeople in Armenia